The Master of the Treasury was an Italian painter working in the Italo-Byzantine style during the middle of the thirteenth century.  A follower of Giunta Pisano, he is known from a painting in the treasury of the Basilica of San Francesco d'Assisi representing the titular saint and four of his posthumous miracles.

References
Morello, Giovanni and Laurence B. Kanter, ed.: The Treasury of Saint Francis of Assisi.  Milan; Electa, 1999.

13th-century Italian painters
Treasury, Master of the
Umbrian painters